Alice Ruble was a state legislator in Colorado. She served in the Colorado House of Representatives. She nominated Henry M. Teller for U.S. Senator in support of his re-election. She served in Colorado's 14th General Assembly

A Democrat, she was elected to represent Denver in 1902. John S. Shaw contested her election.

References

Year of birth missing
Year of death missing
Women state legislators in Colorado
Members of the Colorado House of Representatives
20th-century American women politicians
20th-century American politicians
Politicians from Denver